The Rt. Rev. Edmund Courtenay Pearce was the inaugural Bishop of Derby from 1927 until his death in 1935. His brother Ernest was the Bishop of Worcester from 1919 to 1930.

Born on 17 December 1870 and educated at Christ's Hospital and Corpus Christi College, Cambridge, he was ordained in 1899. His career began with a curacy at St James, Muswell Hill. He was then Vicar of St Bene't's, Cambridge, Dean then Master of his old college and finally (before his elevation to the episcopate) Vice-Chancellor of the University. He died while taking a confirmation service near Glossop.

Notes

1870 births
People educated at Christ's Hospital
Alumni of Corpus Christi College, Cambridge
Fellows of Corpus Christi College, Cambridge
Masters of Corpus Christi College, Cambridge
Vice-Chancellors of the University of Cambridge
Bishops of Derby
20th-century Church of England bishops
1935 deaths